Charles Bradfield Morrey Jr. (July 23, 1907 – April 29, 1984) was an American mathematician who made fundamental contributions to the calculus of variations and the theory of partial differential equations.

Life 
Charles Bradfield Morrey Jr. was born July 23, 1907 in Columbus, Ohio; his father was a professor of bacteriology at Ohio State University, and his mother was president of a school of music in Columbus, therefore it can be said that his one was a family of academicians. Perhaps from his mother's influence, he had a lifelong love for piano, even if mathematics was his main interest since his childhood. He was at first educated in the public schools of Columbus and, before going to the university, he spent a year at Staunton Military Academy in Staunton, Virginia.

In 1933, during his stay at the Department of Mathematics of the University of California, Berkeley as an instructor, he met Frances Eleonor Moss, who had just started studying for her M.A.: they married in 1937 and had three children. With summers off the family enjoyed traveling: they crossed the United States by car at least 20 times, visiting many natural wonders, and looked forward to the AMS meetings, held each year in August. They usually spent abroad their sabbatical leaves, and doing so they visited nearly every European country, witnessing many changes succeeding during the period from the 1950s to the 1980s.

Academic career
Morrey graduated from Ohio State University with a B.A. in 1927 and a M.A. in 1928, and then studied at Harvard University under the supervision of George Birkhoff, obtaining a Ph.D. in 1931 with a thesis entitled Invariant functions of Conservative Surface Transformations. After being awarded his Ph.D, he was a National Research Council Fellow at Princeton, at the Rice Institute and finally at the University of Chicago. He became a professor of mathematics at UC Berkeley in 1933, hired by Griffith Conrad Evans, and was a faculty member until his retirement in 1973. In Berkeley, he was early given several administrative duties, for example being the Chairman of the Department of Mathematics during the period 1949–1954, and being the Acting Chairman, the Vice Chairman and the Director of the Institute of Pure and Applied Mathematics at various times. During the years 1937–1938 and 1954–1955 he was a member of the Institute for Advanced Study: he was also Visiting Assistant Professor at Northwestern University, Visiting Professor at the University of Chicago and Miller Research Professor at Berkeley. During World War II he was employed as a mathematician at the U.S. Ballistic Research Laboratory in Maryland.

Honors
In 1962 he was elected member of the National Academy of Sciences: on May 12, 1965 he was elected fellow member of the American Academy of Arts and Sciences. From 1967 to 1968 he was president of the American Mathematical Society. On the fifth of June 1973 he was awarded the prestigious Berkeley Citation.  refers also that other honors were granted him, but she does not gives any further detail.

Tracts of his personality
 describe him as really very gifted for friendship, having a charming sense of humor and being continuously attentive for people, mathematics and musics. His human qualities are described as the complement to his ability in administrative duties and in scientific research: as a confirmation of his skills in scientific research, also  states that he was one of the strongest workers in analysis.

The Charles B. Morrey Jr. Assistant Professorship
In 1985 his widow, Frances Eleonor Morrey, née Ross, established the Charles B. Morrey Jr. Assistant Professorship at the Berkeley Mathematics department, to honor his memory.

Work

Research activity

Morrey worked on numerous fundamental problems in analysis, among them, the existence of quasiconformal maps, the measurable Riemann mapping theorem, Plateau's problem in the setting of Riemannian manifolds, and the characterization of lower semicontinuous variational problems in terms of quasiconvexity. He greatly contributed to the solution of Hilbert's nineteenth and twentieth problems.

Teaching activity
Charles B. Morrey Jr. was a very effective teacher. His book  was the forerunner of a sequence of texts on calculus and analytic geometry, written in collaboration with Murray H. Protter. Morrey was also a successful advanced level teacher and thesis supervisor: at least 17 Ph.D. dissertations were written under his supervision.

Selected publications
. The library file of C. B. Morrey Jr.'s master thesis (M. A. Thesis) at the university library of Ohio State University.
. The library file of C. B. Morrey Jr.'s doctoral thesis, at the library of Harvard University.
.

.
.
.
. 
. Available at NUMDAM.
.
.
.

See also
Direct method in the calculus of variations
Calculus of variations
Plateau's problem

Notes

References

Biographical references
. 
. 
.
. 
.
.
.
.
.
.
.
.
. 
.
. A description of the history and the rules of one of the four highest honors that the Berkeley campus bestows, including a list of past recipients.

Scientific references
.
. The work of Cesari summarizing the theory of surface area, including his own contributions to the subject.
. "The work of Leonida Tonelli and his influence on scientific thinking in this century" (English translation of the title) is an ample commemorative article, reporting recollections of the Author about teachers and colleagues, and a detailed survey of his and theirs scientific work, presented at the International congress in occasion of the celebration of the centenary of birth of Mauro Picone and Leonida Tonelli (held in Rome on May 6–9, 1985).
. This paper, included in the Proceedings of the Study Meeting in Memory of Giuseppe Gemignani, is an account of the failures of Vito Volterra, Leonida Tonelli and Francesco Severi, when dealing with particular research problems during their career. An English translation of the title reads as:-"Three battles lost by three great Italian mathematicians".
.

External links 

.

                   

1907 births
1984 deaths
20th-century American mathematicians
Harvard University alumni
Mathematical analysts
Members of the United States National Academy of Sciences
Institute for Advanced Study visiting scholars
Ohio State University alumni
PDE theorists
Presidents of the American Mathematical Society
University of California, Berkeley faculty
Variational analysts